Nicholas Chevalier (9 May 1828 – 15 March 1902) was a Russian-born artist who worked in Australia and New Zealand.

Early life
Chevalier was born in St Petersburg, Russia, the son of Louis Chevalier, who came from Vaud, Switzerland, and was overseer to the estates of the Prince de Wittgenstein in Russia. Nicholas' mother was Russian. Nicholas left Russia with his father in 1845, and studied painting and architecture in Lausanne, Switzerland and at Munich. The materials used in this painting are oil paints on canvas.

Career

In 1851 Chevalier moved to London and worked as an illustrator in lithography and watercolour. He also designed a fountain which was erected in the royal grounds at Osborne, and two of his paintings were hung at the Academy in 1852. Further study in painting followed at Rome. In late 1854 Chevalier sailed from London to Australia on board the 'Swallow' to join his father and brother, and arrived in Melbourne on 25 December. In August 1855 he obtained work as a cartoonist on the newly established Melbourne Punch. Later he did illustrative work for the Illustrated Australian News and also worked in chromolithography. He accompanied explorer/meteorologist Georg von Neumayer on trips to remote areas of Victoria, and the material gathered on such journeys resulted in some of his most recognised pieces of this period, including his painting of Mount Arapiles in Western Victoria.

Chevalier designed a dress for the governor's wife the botanist Lady Anne Maria Barkly. The outfit incorporated the Southern Cross and Chevalier also designed a lyrebird-inspired fan as an accessory to the outfit. It appears that she never wore the dress as she chose to appear as a "Marquise of the Court of Louis XV" for the Mayor's Fany Dress Ball in 1863. Chevalier's dress design was rejected by Bankly but they collaborated to work on a present for the newly married Princess of Wales in the same year. The present was from the women of Victoria and like the dress the chosen silver and gold flower stand design featured icons of Australian life.

In 1864, when the National Gallery of Victoria was founded, an exhibition of works by Victorian artists was held. The government agreed to buy the best picture exhibited for £200. Chevalier's oil painting The Buffalo Ranges was selected, and was the first picture painted in Australia to be included in the Melbourne collection. In 1865 Chevalier visited New Zealand, travelling widely and doing much work there which was exhibited at Melbourne on his return. In 1869 he joined  as an artist with the Duke of Edinburgh, on the voyage to the East and back to London with stops in Tahiti, Hawaii, Japan, China, Ceylon (Sri Lanka) and India.  The pictures painted during the voyage were exhibited at South Kensington.

In January 1874 Chevalier was commissioned by Queen Victoria to travel to St Petersburg and paint a picture of the marriage of the Duke of Edinburgh. Chevalier made London his base and was a continual exhibitor at the Academy from 1871 to 1887. He had one picture in the 1895 Academy but had practically given up painting by then. Chevalier died in London on 15 March 1902.

Legacy

Chevalier married Caroline Wilkie in 1855, a relative of Sir David Wilkie, who survived him.  Chevalier was a man of much personal charm and spoke fluent French, English, Russian, German, Italian and Portuguese. He was a good amateur musician being second violinist in the Royal Amateur Orchestral Society which had been started by officers in the Galatea and in which the duke was first violin.

The Museum of New Zealand Te Papa Tongarewa, the Dunedin Public Art Gallery (New Zealand), the Honolulu Museum of Art, the National Gallery of Victoria, the Ballarat Fine Art Gallery, Art Gallery of New South Wales and the National Library of Australia (Canberra) are among the public collections holding works by Nicholas Chevalier.

In 2011 Nicholas Chevalier was the subject of a major survey exhibition and publication, 'Australian Odyssey', mounted by the Gippsland Art Gallery, and subsequently toured to the Geelong Gallery, Victoria.

References

Melvin Day, Nicholas Chevalier - Artist - His Life and Work with Special Reference to His Career in New Zealand and Australia. Wellington, New Zealand: Millwood Press, 1981. 
Marjorie J. Tipping, 'Chevalier, Nicholas (1828 - 1902)', Australian Dictionary of Biography, Volume 3, MUP, 1969, pp 387–388.
 Forbes, David W., Encounters with Paradise: Views of Hawaii and its People, 1778-1941, Honolulu Academy of Arts, 1992, 92 & 162-163.

Neil Roberts, Nicholas Chevalier: an artist’s journey through Canterbury in 1866. Christchurch, New Zealand: Robert McDougall Art Gallery, 1992.
Simon Gregg, Nicholas Chevalier: Australian Odyssey. Sale, Australia: Gippsland Art Gallery, 2011.
Andrew Sayers, Australian Art. Melbourne, Australia: Oxford University Press, 2001.

External links

 from the Dictionary of New Zealand Biography
Artworks in the collection of the Museum of New Zealand Te Papa Tongarewa
Artworks in the collection of the National Gallery of Australia
 

1828 births
1902 deaths
Artists from London
Painters from Saint Petersburg
19th-century Australian painters
19th-century Australian male artists
Australian landscape painters
Australian male painters
19th-century painters from the Russian Empire
19th-century male artists from the Russian Empire
Russian landscape painters
Russian male painters